A uniform tessellation may refer to:
A uniform tiling in 2-dimensions
A uniform honeycomb of 2 or higher dimensions